Enispiella grisella is a species of beetle in the family Cerambycidae, and the only species in the genus Enispiella. It was described by Breuning in 1938.

References

Apomecynini
Beetles described in 1938
Monotypic Cerambycidae genera